The Sun was the newspaper for Sheridan, Oregon, United States. The paper was published weekly on Wednesdays. The Sun served the West Yamhill Valley communities of Sheridan, Willamina, and Grand Ronde in Yamhill and Polk counties.

History 
Sheridan's newspaper was founded in 1890, and was a weekly newspaper. In 1908, O. D. Hamstreet purchased the newspaper after moving from Sheridan, Wyoming, where he had been editor of the Sheridan Enterprise. Pulibcation of the paper was stopped in June, 2014.

References

External links 
 The Sun Archives
 Picture of newspaper office after 1913 fire

1890 establishments in Oregon
2014 disestablishments in Oregon
Defunct newspapers published in Oregon
Publications established in 1890
Sheridan, Oregon